Gaston Feuillard (14 April 1904, Anjouan, Comoros – 13 March 1978, Paris) was a politician from Comoros who represented Guadeloupe in the French National Assembly from 1958-1973.

References 
 page on the French National Assembly website

1904 births
1978 deaths
People from Anjouan
Comorian politicians
National Centre of Independents and Peasants politicians
Independent Republicans politicians
Union of Democrats for the Republic politicians
Deputies of the 1st National Assembly of the French Fifth Republic
Deputies of the 2nd National Assembly of the French Fifth Republic
Deputies of the 4th National Assembly of the French Fifth Republic